Dil Mohallay Ki Haveli is a Pakistani mystery thriller drama television series, directed by Amin Iqbal, written by Amna Mufti and first broadcast on Geo Entertainment in 2013. Retitled as Meri Talaash, it also aired in India on Zindagi channel from 17 July 2015 on Monday through Saturday nights.

Synopsis 

The story revolves around an elderly lady Amma Bi she belongs to a well cultured dynasty from Delhi. Living in a suburban area Radha Kishan Nagar with her three sons Faheem, Azeem and Saad. Azeem being the eldest has always had his eyes on the mother’s inherent wealth. Amma Bi is very particular about her food specially the taste that it carries, to her food means culture and in this matter she is somewhat old fashioned and stubborn. A slight mistake in the proportions of spices is a crime without pardon for her daughters-in-law.

Cast 

 Samina Ahmed as Amma Bi
 Noor ul Hassan as Azeem
 Sarmad Khoosat as Faheem
 Sami Khan as Saad
 Nadia Afgan as Safiya
 Yumna Zaidi as Mehrunnisa
 Nirvaan Nadeem as Shehroze
 Adla Khan as Rabia
 Erum Akhtar as Mehrunnisa's sister
 Zainab Ahmed as Fakiha
 Ash Khan as Muneera

Broadcast and release 
The series originally broadcast on Geo Entertainment. It aired in India on Zindagi with the title Meri Talaash and is also available on streaming platform ZEE5 with same title.

References

Geo TV original programming
Pakistani television series
Pakistani drama television series
Urdu-language television shows